The Old Sopchoppy High School Gymnasium  is a historic site in Sopchoppy, Florida, located at the junction of 2nd Avenue and Summer Street. On June 1, 1990, it was added to the U.S. National Register of Historic Places.

Gallery

In popular culture
Venorated by Tim Dorsey (and christened by protagonist Serge Storms) in the 2017 novel Clownfish Blues.

References

External links

 Wakulla County listings at National Register of Historic Places
 Florida's Office of Cultural and Historical Programs
 Wakulla County listings
 Old Sopchoppy High School Gymnasium

Buildings and structures in Wakulla County, Florida
School buildings on the National Register of Historic Places in Florida
National Register of Historic Places in Wakulla County, Florida